Gölbaşı is a village in the Savur District of Mardin Province in Turkey. The village is populated by Arabs of the Kose tribe and had a population of 265 in 2021.

References 

Villages in Savur District
Arab settlements in Mardin Province